The Iranian Department of Environment is a governmental organization, under the supervision of the president, that is responsible for matters related to safeguarding the environment.

The origins of the department can be traced back to the Hunting Club of Iran, established in 1956. Later, it developed into an organization overseeing hunting and fishing activities in the country. In 1971 the organization changed its name to its current one, and notably has hosted the Ramsar Convention on Wetlands of International Importance in the city of Ramsar on the same year.

Today the organization maintains a list of four types of protected areas as follows:
 23 National Parks, including Kavir, Touran, and Tandooreh National Parks,
 32 National Natural Monuments, including Mounts Damavand, Sabalan, Taftan, and Alam-Kuh,
 37 Wildlife Refuges, including Hamoon and Miandasht Wildlife Refuges, and
 117 Protected Areas, including Mounts Dena and Alvand, Lake Parishan, Jajrood, Karkheh, and Haraz Rivers, and Arasbaran.

An Iranian parliamentarian, Mohammad Javad Nazari-Maehr, on Sept. 18 proposed that Iran's Department of Environment be merged with Iran's Forestry, Rangeland and Watershed Department and converted into a ministry. (Tasnim News Agency)

Massoumeh Ebtekar, the head of Iran’s Department of Environment, in a letter to UN Secretary-General Ban Ki-moon, warned that Western sanctions have inflicted irreparable damage to the environment not just in Iran, but also in the region and the world.

See also
Economy of Iran
Environment of Iran
Government of Iran

References

External links

Iran
Government of Iran